Saihat City is a city located on the east coast of Saudi Arabia, with a population of 100,000 in 2005.

History 
The oldest documents concerning Saihat, which are more than 400 years old, say that Saihat was under the division of Dhahran. During the Ottoman Empire, the cities under Dhahran included Saihat, Bankat, Asseeh, and Aljabba. People in that region built the city of Sawhat on the remains of the old city Avan. This name was mentioned in Al-Musadi's book (التبية والإشراف). The city was renamed Saihat in more modern times.

In English the name of Saihat has various spellings. In the past, it was written as 'Seahat,' but recently the spelling has been changed by some to 'Sayhat.'

Nature 
Saihat is located directly on the Persian Gulf. Fishing and agriculture are two important industries. Fertile soil and fresh springs provide a home for palm groves. The oil companies are close to Saihat, many people work there or in activities related to the oil industry.

Geography
Saihat is a small house close to Qatif prefecture, which forms the southern end of the city. Dammam borders Saihat from the south while all of Saihat's eastern border lies on the Persian Gulf. The estimated size of Saihat is 5.61 square kilometers. Its population is about 75,000.

Hospitals
 Al Sadiq Hospital Abu Musa Alansari, An Nur, Tel:013 850 0160

Transport

Airport

Highway
Saihat is directly located on the Dhahran-Jubail Highway and has its own exit, Abu Hadriyah Highway is also close.

Neighborhood names 
 Addeera (city center)
 An Nur (called Al Tabooq, or Al Ommal before)
 Al Khasab
 Attaf
 Ghurnata (or Al Nimr Al Janoubi)
 Assalam
 Al Khaleej (or Al Kuwait)
 Qurtuba (includes Al Mahdoud, Al Falah, and Al Nimr Ashimali)
 Al Ferdaws
 Al Muntazah (includes Al Jamiyah)
 Al Kawthar
 Al Neqa
 Al Ghadeer
 Annaseem
 Al Faiha
 Al Zohor

Helpful Websites 
(Charities)
 Saihat Society for Social Services http://www.saihatss.org
(Sports)
 Khaleej Sports Club http://khaleejclub.com/
(Media & News)
 Khaleej Saihat News http://khaleejsaihat.com/news
(Food & Beverages)
 Saihat Restaurants  http://www.saihatrestaurants.com

References 
Mr. Hussain Al Silham Books:
 A History of Saihat
 Saihat & the Sea
 Saihat Society

External links
https://web.archive.org/web/20120311140301/http://www.cdsi.gov.sa/pdf/census31-prim-05.pdf

Populated places in Eastern Province, Saudi Arabia
Port cities and towns in Saudi Arabia
Port cities and towns of the Persian Gulf